Churchville can refer to a location in North America:

Canada
Churchville, Elgin County, Ontario
Churchville, Peel Regional Municipality, Ontario
Churchville, Pictou County, Nova Scotia
United States
Churchville, Iowa
Churchville, Maryland
Churchville, New York
Churchville, Pennsylvania
Churchville, Virginia
Churchville, West Virginia